Sanskritisation (or Sanskritization) is a term in sociology which refers to the process by which castes or tribes placed lower in the caste hierarchy seek 'upward' mobility by emulating the rituals and practices of the dominant castes or upper castes. It is a process similar to "passing" in sociological terms. This term was made popular by Indian sociologist M. N. Srinivas in the 1950s.

In a broader sense, also called Brahmanisation, it is a historical process in which "local" Indian religious traditions become syncretised, or aligned to and absorbed within the Brahmanical religion, resulting in the pan-Indian religion of Hinduism.

Definition
Srinivas defined Sanskritisation as a process by which

In a broader sense, Sanskritisation is

In this process, local traditions ("little traditions") become integrated into the "great tradition" of Brahmanical religion, disseminating Sanskrit texts and Brahmanical ideas throughout India, and abroad. This facilitated the development of the Hindu synthesis, in which the Brahmanical tradition absorbed "local popular traditions of ritual and ideology."

According to Srinivas, Sanskritisation is not just the adoption of new customs and habits, but also includes exposure to "new" ideas and values appearing in Sanskrit literature. He says the words Karma, dharma, paap, maya, samsara, and moksha are the most common Sanskrit theological ideas which become common in the talk of people who are sanskritised.

Development
Srinivas first propounded this theory in his D.Phil. thesis at Oxford. The thesis was later brought out as a book, which was an ethnographical study of the Kodava (Coorgs) community of Karnataka. Srinivas writes:

The book challenged the then prevalent idea that caste was a rigid and unchanging institution. The concept of sanskritisation addressed the actual complexity and fluidity of caste relations. It brought into academic focus the dynamics of the renegotiation of status by various castes and communities in India.

Jaffrelot goes on to say, "While the term was coined by Srinivas, the process itself had been described by colonial administrators such as E. T. Atkinson in his Himalayan Gazetteer and Alfred Lyall, in whose works Ambedkar might well have encountered it."

Virginius Xaxa notes that sometimes the anthropologists also use the term "Kshatriyisation" and "Rajputisation" in place of Sanskritisation.

Examples
Sanskritisation is often aimed to claim the Varna status of Brahmin or Kshatriyas, the two prestigious Varna of the Vedic-age Varna system. One of the main example of it is various non-elite pastoral communities like Ahir, Gopa, Ahar, Goala etc. who adopted the Yadav word as part of Sanskritisation effort to gain upward mobility in society during late 19th century to early 20th century. Similar attempts were made by communities who were historically classed as non-elite tillers like Kurmi and various communities like  Koeri, Murao etc. from the late 19th century onwards through their caste organisations by claiming higher social status.  Kalwar caste is traditionally involved into distillation and selling of liquor, but around the start of the 20th century, various  organisations related to the caste sought to redefine the image of their community through this process.

Another example in North India is of Rajput. According to historical evidence, the present day Rajput community varies greatly in status, comprising those with royal lineage to those whose ancestors were petty tenants or tribals who gained land and political power to justify their claim of being Kshatriya.

One clear example of Sanskritisation is the adoption, in emulation of the practice of twice-born castes, of vegetarianism by people belonging to the so-called "low castes" who are traditionally not averse to non-vegetarian food.

One more example is of Hindu Jat in rural North India who did Sanskritisation with the help of Arya Samaj as a part of a social upliftment effort.

An unsuccessful example is the Vishwakarma caste's claim to Brahmin status, which is not generally accepted outside that community, despite their adoption of some Brahmin caste traits, such as wearing the sacred thread, and the Brahminisation of their rituals. Srinivas juxtaposed the success of the Lingayat caste in achieving advancement within Karnataka society by such means with the failure of the Vishwakarma to achieve the same. Their position as a left-hand caste has not aided their ambition.

Srinivas was of the view that Sanskritisation was not limited to the Hindu castes, and stated that the "semi–tribal groups" including Himalayas's Pahadis, central India's Gonds and Oraons, and western India's Bhils also underwent Sanskritisation. He further suggested that, after going through Sanskritisation, such tribes would claim that they are castes and hence Hindus.
This phenomenon has also been observed in Nepal among Khas, Magar, Newar, and Tharu people.

Reception

Yogendra Singh has critiqued the theory as follows:

See also

 Acculturation
 The Battle for Sanskrit
 Islamization
 Kshatriyas and Would-be Kshatriyas
 Lingayat
 List of institutions with Sanskrit mottos
 List of Sanskrit universities in India
 Pāṇini
 Sanskrit cinema
 Sanskrit studies 
 Shiksha

Explanatory footnotes

References

Citations

General sources

External links

 
 
 

Caste system in India
Cultural assimilation
Sanskrit
Social change
Hinduism and evolution